is a Japanese video game, amusement and anime holding company created in 2009 by the merger of Koei and Tecmo. Koei Tecmo Holdings owns several companies, the biggest one of those being its flagship game developer and publisher Koei Tecmo Games that was founded in 1978 as Koei.

Koei Europe was the first subsidiary to change its name to Tecmo Koei Europe, Ltd and to release video games under the new moniker. In January 2010, Tecmo, Inc. and Koei Corporation followed suit by merging to form Tecmo Koei America Corporation. The company is best known for their Nobunaga's Ambition, Ninja Gaiden, Dead or Alive, Atelier, Dynasty Warriors, Monster Rancher, Fatal Frame, and Nioh franchises.

On April 1, 2010, Tecmo was declared disbanded in Japan. Its sister company Koei survived but was renamed Tecmo Koei Games (today Koei Tecmo Games) and is now the main publishing arm of the group in Japan. The former development divisions of Tecmo and Koei were briefly spun-off as separate companies in March 2010, but folded into Tecmo Koei Games in April 2011. In addition to its primary trademark, Koei Tecmo Games occasionally used until 2016 the "Tecmo" and "Koei" brand names on new video games for marketing purposes.

History

Independent era

Koei

Koei Co., Ltd. (株式会社コーエー Kabushiki gaisha Kōē, formerly 光栄 (Kōei)) was founded in July 1978 by husband-and-wife duo Yoichi and Keiko Erikawa. Yoichi was a student at Keio University, and when his family's rural dyestuffs business failed he decided to pursue his interest in programming. The company was (and, as Koei Tecmo, still is) located in the Hiyoshi area of Yokohama along with Yoichi's alma mater, and the company's name is simply a spoonerism of the school's.

Kō Shibusawa and Eiji Fukuzawa, whose names are supposed to have made up the name of the company, do not really exist and are names used by the company to avoid giving credit to individual contributors, effectively acting as pen names for the Erikawas.

The company initially focused on personal computer sales and made-to-order business software. In 1983 it released Nobunaga's Ambition (信長の野望 Nobunaga no Yabō), a historical strategy game set during the Sengoku period of Japanese history. The game went on to receive numerous awards, and Koei produced several more such games set against the backdrop of world history, including Romance of the Three Kingdoms, set during the Three Kingdoms period of Chinese history, and Uncharted Waters (大航海時代 Dai Kōkai Jidai; lit. Great Navigation Era), set in Portugal during the Age of Exploration.

In 1988, Koei established a North American subsidiary, Koei Corporation, in California. This subsidiary localized Koei games for export to all territories outside Japan, as well as producing original games and concepts with the leadership of designer Stieg Hedlund, like Liberty or Death, Celtic Tales: Balor of the Evil Eye, and Gemfire . After Hedlund's departure, this subsidiary ceased game development in 1995, focusing instead on localization, sales and marketing.

A Canadian subsidiary, Koei Canada, Inc. was established in early 2001, and a European subsidiary, Koei Limited was established in early 2003 in Hertfordshire, United Kingdom. In 2004, a Lithuanian subsidiary was formed.

Tecmo

Two years later, in 1969, it started to sell amusement equipment. Tecmo had its headquarters in Kudankita, Chiyoda, Tokyo. Tecmo's United States offices were located in Torrance, California.

In March 1981, a U.S. division was inaugurated as U.S. Tehkan, Inc.. A month later, in April 1981, Tehkan released in Japan its first arcade video game titled Pleiades (which was distributed in America by Centuri). When it was still called Tehkan, the company also released such classic games as Bomb Jack and Tehkan World Cup. On January 8, 1986, Tehkan officially changed its name to Tecmo. In 1989 Tecmo was named as co-defendant in a lawsuit, when Indianapolis Colts running back Eric Dickerson sued the NFLPA over use of his likeness in the game Tecmo Bowl.

In 2006, Founder, President and Chairman Yoshihito Kakihara died of interstitial pneumonia.

On June 3, 2008, Team Ninja head Tomonobu Itagaki resigned from the company and filed a 145 million yen ($1.3 million) lawsuit for "unpaid completion bonuses" and "emotional distress". This was followed by another lawsuit filed on 16 June by two plaintiffs on behalf of Tecmo's 300 employees for unpaid wages amounting to ¥8.3 million.

Merger and reorganization
On August 20, 2008, Tecmo announced the resignation of president Yoshimi Yasuda, to be replaced by current Chairman of the Board Yasuharu Kakihara as of September 1. On August 28, Square Enix announced plans for a friendly takeover of Tecmo by purchasing shares at a 30 percent premium with a total bid of ¥22.3 billion. They gave Tecmo until September 4 to either accept or reject the proposal. Upon hearing this news on August 31, Kenji Matsubara, President and COO of Koei, called a board meeting for the next day, September 1. The board discussed the possibility of a merger with Tecmo, and began discussions with Tecmo that same day. On September 4, 2008 Tecmo officially declined Square Enix's proposal, and later that same day announced plans to merge with Koei.

In November, the companies announced their specific plan of action, to complete the merger on April 1, 2009, forming Tecmo Koei Holdings. Koei stock was to be exchanged for Tecmo Koei stock at a rate of 1:1, and Tecmo stock exchanged at .9:1, giving Koei shareholders, in total, a three-quarter stake in the new company. Though the combined profits in 2007 were 8.5 billion yen, they anticipated that the merged company would net over 16 billion yen in the fiscal year ending March 2012. Effissimo Capital Management Pte, Tecmo's second-largest shareholder at 17.6%, openly opposed the merger. On January 26, 2009, the shareholders for both Koei and Tecmo reached separate agreements in favor of the merger. Effissimo raised some dissent during the meeting, and implied they may seek to sell their shares. Effissimo's director Takashi Kosaka stated “We have not had sufficient information from the company to make a judgment on the merger, such as the feasibility of their plan to raise shareholder value.” On February 12, Kenji Matsubara liquidated KOEI France SAS. On February 13, Tecmo announced it had received a repurchase claim (a request for the company to buy stock back) from a major shareholder, 15.64% of the stock (3,890,700 shares) from a shareholder that stood in opposition to the firm's upcoming merger with Koei. While the requesting shareholder was not mentioned, Reuters stated that it was likely Effissimo.

Despite these misgivings, the holding company formed on April 1, 2009 as planned. The development divisions of both companies were spun-out into separate subsidiaries, created specifically for the planning and development of software, operating directly under the holding company. Kenji Matsubara became CEO of the new company, and former Tecmo CEO Yasuharu Kakihara became board chairman. As of May 26, Tecmo Koei had still not reached an agreement with Effissimo, prompting the investment fund to seek mediation with the Tokyo District Court. While Tecmo Koei favored a stock value in the mid-600 yen range, Effissimo was expected to ask for at least 900, in part due to the rejected Square Enix offer of 920 per share.

On June 23, 2009, Tecmo Koei announced a planned restructure of its international subsidiaries. Koei Europe was renamed Tecmo Koei Europe in 2009 and became the first subsidiary to publish games under the new moniker, starting with Ninja Gaiden Sigma 2. In August 2009 Tecmo Koei announced that it was setting up a subsidiary in Hanoi, Vietnam. In January 2010, Tecmo's sole subsidiary, the American Tecmo Inc., and Koei's American branch, Koei Corporation, were moved under a newly formed Tecmo Koei America Corporation, itself a direct subsidiary to Tecmo Koei Holdings. Koei's Canadian, Korean, and Taiwanese subsidiaries were re-branded Tecmo Koei, and also moved to direct subsidiaries of the holding company. Later that month the Entertainment Software Association (ESA) announced that Tecmo Koei was now a member.

On April 1, 2010, Koei absorbed Tecmo in Japan to become Tecmo Koei Games, which renamed itself to Koei Tecmo Games in 2014.  Koei Singapore was also re-branded as Tecmo Koei.

Post-merger
On February 8, 2011, Tecmo Koei Holdings announced that the new individual developers Tecmo and Koei that were formed in March 2010 would be merged into Tecmo Koei Games in April 2011, though the company will continue to develop under the Tecmo and Koei brands.

The continued operating loss prompted Kenji Matsubara, the former president and CEO of both Tecmo Koei Holdings and Tecmo Koei Games label, to render his resignation in November 2010. Yoichi Erikawa, co-founder of Koei, took over the four positions vacated by Matsubara.

On July 1, 2014, the company and its related subsidiaries were renamed from Tecmo Koei to Koei Tecmo.

On February 18, 2016, Koei Tecmo announced a second reorganization of the company, to support the expansion of the company. Brand names Team Tachyon, Koei and Tecmo, amongst others, were dropped.

Current Subsidiaries/Divisions

Gust

Gust Co. Ltd. was founded in 1993  and is best known for its long-running Atelier series. Koei Tecmo bought Gust Co. Ltd. in 2011 and absorbed it in 2014.

Kou Shibusawa
On February 18, 2016, as part of the companies reconstruction, Koei Tecmo announced the establishment of Kou Shibusawa, named after the stage name of Koei's founder. It has handled the historically-based titles such as Nobunaga's Ambition series, Romance of the Three Kingdoms series, Uncharted Waters series and Nioh series, as well as horse racing simulation Winning Post series. The division also worked as lead developer with Intelligent Systems on Fire Emblem: Three Houses.

Midas
"midas" is a new division aiming to produce titles for smartphones and to create new IPs.

Omega Force

Omega Force (ω-Force) is a division of Koei. Omega Force are most well known for its Dynasty Warriors series, including spin-offs such as Samurai Warriors, Warriors Orochi, amongst others. As well as non-Warriors titles such as Dragon Quest Heroes, WinBack, Attack on Titan and Toukiden.

Ruby Party

Ruby Party specializes in games labeled as Neoromance: otome game visual novels and dating sims, usually with extra side-quests. Out of the three Neoromance series, the best known is Angelique series, which has been in production since 1994. The first game of Angelique series was the first otome game (visual novel and dating sims for women) in the world.

Team Ninja

Team Ninja (stylised as Team NINJA) is a video game development studio of Tecmo founded in 1995. It was formerly led by Tomonobu Itagaki and is best known for the Dead or Alive and Ninja Gaiden series.

International offices
Koei Tecmo also operates various international branches and offices, such as Koei Tecmo Europe in Hertfordshire, England, Koei Tecmo America in Burlingame, California, Koei Tecmo Taiwan in Taipei, Koei Tecmo Vietnam in Hanoi, Koei Tecmo Singapore, as well was two offices in China, located in Tiajin and Beijing.

Former Subsidiaries

Team Tachyon
Team Tachyon is a Japanese video game development department of Koei Tecmo founded in 2007. Similar to Team Ninja, the group was formed to develop high-profile games, some of which relate to Tecmo Koei's classic franchises. The company says that they chose the name, "Team Tachyon", because a tachyon is a particle that exceeds the speed of light. Key members include Tecmo producers Keisuke Kikuchi (Rygar, Fatal Frame) and Kohei Shibata.

So far, Team Tachyon has aided in the development of the 2008 Fatal Frame IV: Mask of the Lunar Eclipse game for the Wii, 2008 Wii game Rygar: The Battle of Argus, has released Undead Knights for the PlayStation Portable, and Quantum Theory for the PlayStation 3 and the Xbox 360, released in 2010. Spirit Camera: The Cursed Memoir was developed for the Nintendo 3DS and released in 2012, Project Zero 2: Wii Edition was released on the same year for the Wii and Fatal Frame: Maiden of Black Water was released in 2015 for the Wii U.

As of February 18, 2016, Team Tachyon was absorbed into Team Ninja, with some staff now moved to Gust.

Koei Tecmo Canada
Founded in 2001 as Koei Canada, Koei Tecmo Canada was the North American development arm of the company based in Toronto. It started out as a CG studio for Koei games but expanded into video game development in 2005, developing Fatal Inertia, Prey the Stars, and Warriors: Legends of Troy. The studio was closed at the end of March 2013.

Notable games published 

 Atelier series
 Dead or Alive series
 Dynasty Warriors series
 Fatal Frame series
 Monster Rancher series
 Ninja Gaiden series
 Nioh series
 Nobunaga's Ambition series
 Romance of the Three Kingdoms series
 Samurai Warriors series
 Tamashii no Mon Dante no Shinkyoku yori (魂の門 ダンテ「神曲」より, Literally: Gate of Souls ~ From Dante's Divine Comedy)
 Uncharted Waters series
 Winning Post series

IP collaboration:
 Final Fantasy series
 Dissidia Final Fantasy NT
 Stranger of Paradise: Final Fantasy Origin
 Fate/Samurai Remnants
 Nintendo original series
 Fire Emblem series
 Fire Emblem: Three Houses
 Fire Emblem Warriors series
 Hyrule Warriors series
 Metroid: Other M
 Marvel Ultimate Alliance 3: The Black Order
 Mobile Suit Gundam Warriors series
 One Piece: Pirate Warriors series
 Persona 5 Strikers
 Pokémon Conquest

Notes

References

External links

  

 
Companies based in Yokohama
Japanese companies established in 2009
Video game companies established in 2009
Anime companies
Holding companies established in 2009
Video game companies of Japan
Video game development companies
Video game publishers
Companies listed on the Tokyo Stock Exchange
Holding companies of Japan